Good Gravy! is an album by saxophonist Teddy Edwards which was recorded in 1961 and released on the Contemporary label.

Reception

Allmusic awarded the album 4 stars stating "Edwards is in typically swinging form on this quartet date".

Track listing 
All compositions by Teddy Edwards except where noted.
 "Good Gravy" – 5:26  
 "Could You Forget" – 5:40  
 "Stairway to the Stars" (Matty Malneck, Frank Signorelli, Mitchell Parish) – 4:39  
 "A Little Later" (Nathaniel Meeks) – 4:14  
 "On Green Dolphin Street" (Bronisław Kaper, Ned Washington) – 5:23  
 "Just Friends" (John Klenner, Sam M. Lewis) – 5:17  
 "Laura" (Johnny Mercer, David Raksin) – 3:16  
 "Yes, I'll Be Ready" – 4:03  
 "Not So Strange Blues" – 3:02

Personnel 
Teddy Edwards – tenor saxophone
Danny Horton (tracks 1-3 & 6-9), Phineas Newborn, Jr. (tracks 4 & 5) – piano
Leroy Vinnegar – bass
Milt Turner – drums

References 

Teddy Edwards albums
1961 albums
Contemporary Records albums